Glenbar is a rural locality in the Fraser Coast Region, Queensland, Australia.

History 
The land was offered for selection on 17 April 1877.

References 

Fraser Coast Region
Localities in Queensland